Chris Avellone is an American video game designer and comic book writer. He worked for Interplay and Obsidian Entertainment before working as a freelancer. He is best known for his work on role-playing video games such as Planescape: Torment and the Fallout series.

Biography 
Avellone is an alumnus of the Thomas Jefferson High School for Science and Technology in Fairfax County, Virginia. He studied at the College of William & Mary, graduating with a major in English and a minor in fine arts, focused on architecture.

Working initially as a freelancer in the two years after college, Avellone wrote campaigns for Dungeons & Dragons-inspired fantasy role-playing games. After entering the video game industry through the company Interplay in 1995, he briefly worked on the development of the 1997 title Star Trek: Starfleet Academy. In 1997 he took over the development of Descent to Undermountain, which he later called a disappointment. Avellone contributed to the 1998 game Fallout 2 and continued to work on its franchise.

Interplay acquired the rights to produce a role-playing video game set in the Planescape campaign setting with development led by Avellone. The game, Planescape: Torment was released in 1999 and is frequently cited as among the best-written games in history.

Avellone worked on all the games of the Icewind Dale series, which were released from 2000 to 2002. As a designer, Avellone contributed to the fantasy titles Baldur's Gate: Dark Alliance (2001), Champions of Norrath (2004) and led the design of the canceled Fallout title Van Buren, after which he resigned from Interplay and co-founded Obsidian Entertainment. For the company, Avellone worked on the role-playing games Star Wars: Knights of the Old Republic II (2004) and Neverwinter Nights 2 (2006) and on the action role-playing game Alpha Protocol. He also worked as a senior designer on Fallout: New Vegas.

He worked as the project director and lead creative designer on Dead Money, Old World Blues and Lonesome Road  Fallout: New Vegas downloadable content. Avellone worked as a narrative designer on Pillars of Eternity prior to leaving Obsidian Entertainment in June 2015. Avellone has since worked as a freelancer on games such as Pillars of Eternity, Torment: Tides of Numenera, Prey, Divinity: Original Sin II, Pathfinder: Kingmaker, and Into the Breach.

In June 2020, Avellone was accused by three people of using his status for sexual misconduct and harassment towards women during industry conventions. Following these allegations, Techland announced that they and Avellone agreed to end his work on Dying Light 2. Gato Studios also removed Avellone from The Waylanders; according to lead writer Emily Grace Buck, Avellone had "very little writing" over that project, having only penned a few quests that they planned to rewrite. Paradox Interactive said that while Avellone had worked on an early version of Vampire: The Masquerade – Bloodlines 2, much of his work had since been overwritten.

Avellone published a denial of the allegations through Medium in June 2021 and stated he had filed a libel suit against his accusers in a California court.

Works

Video games

Comic books 
Star Wars comics:
Unseen, Unheard (2005)
Heroes on Both Sides (2006)
Impregnable (2007)
Old Scores (2007)
Graduation Day (2007)

Fallout comics:
 Fallout: New Vegas, All Roads (2010, part of the Fallout: New Vegas collector's edition)

Fiction 
 The House of Wael (2016, to Pillars of Eternity Kickstarter backers)

Tabletop role-playing game modules 
 The Puzzle Box (2020, to Pathfinder: Kingmaker Kickstarter backers)
 Dystopia (1994, Champions module published by Atlas Games)

References

External links 
 
 The Guardian interview with Chris Avellone
 SugarBombed interview with Chris Avellone (part 1).
Chris Avellone Interview with Scripts & Scribes.

American comics writers
American video game designers
American writers of Italian descent
Black Isle Studios
Dungeons & Dragons video game designers
Fallout (series) developers
Interplay Entertainment people
Living people
Obsidian Entertainment people
Place of birth missing (living people)
Star Wars: Knights of the Old Republic developers
Thomas Jefferson High School for Science and Technology alumni
Video game writers
Year of birth missing (living people)